Anna Wesselényi (1584–1649), was a Hungarian countess and writer. Her correspondence has been published.

References
 Szinnyei József: Magyar írók élete és munkái II. (Caban–Exner). Budapest: Hornyánszky. 1893.

1584 births
1649 deaths
16th-century Hungarian people
17th-century Hungarian women writers
17th-century Hungarian writers
Hungarian nobility
Anna
16th-century Hungarian writers